This article covers the results and statistics of Dynamo Kyiv during the 2011–12 season. During the season, Dynamo Kyiv competed in the Ukrainian Premier League, Ukrainian Cup, Ukrainian Super Cup, UEFA Champions League and in the UEFA Europa League.

Squad

Transfers

In

Loans in

Out

Loans out

Released

Competitions

Overview

Super Cup

Premier League

Results summary

Results by round

Results

League table

Ukrainian Cup

UEFA Champions League

Qualifying rounds

UEFA Europa League

Qualifying rounds

Group stage

Squad statistics

Appearances and goals

|-
|colspan="16"|Players away from Dynamo Kyiv on loan:

|-
|colspan="16"|Players who left Dynamo Kyiv during the season:

|}

Goal scorers

Clean sheets

Disciplinary record

References

External links
 FC Dynamo Kyiv official website
 FC Dynamo Kyiv on soccerway.com

FC Dynamo Kyiv seasons
Dynamo Kyiv
Dynamo Kyiv